The Representation of the People (Scotland) Act 1832 redefined the boundaries of Scottish constituencies of the House of Commons of the Parliament of the United Kingdom (at Westminster), and the new boundaries were first used in the 1832 general election.

1832 boundaries were used also in the general elections of 1835, 1837, 1841, 1847, 1852, 1857, 1859 and 1865.

As a result of the legislation, there were 21 burgh constituencies and 30 county constituencies. Except for Edinburgh and Glasgow, which were two-seat constituencies, each Scottish constituency represented a seat for one Member of Parliament (MP). Therefore, Scotland had 53 parliamentary seats.

14 of the burgh constituencies were districts of burghs.

The constituencies related nominally to counties and burghs, but boundaries for parliamentary purposes were not necessarily those for other purposes.

For the 1868 general election, new boundaries were defined by the Representation of the People (Scotland) Act 1868.

Burgh Constituencies

County constituencies

 1832
1832 establishments in Scotland
1832 in politics
1868 disestablishments in Scotland
Constituencies of the Parliament of the United Kingdom established in 1832
Constituencies of the Parliament of the United Kingdom disestablished in 1868